is a Japanese professional footballer who plays as a defender for J1 League club Hokkaido Consadole Sapporo.

Career 

Baba begin first youth career with Tokyo Verdy as youth team in 2017 to 2019.

Baba begin first professional career with Tokyo Verdy in 2020 after promoted to top team. He left from the club in 2022 after two years at Tokyo.

On 22 December 2022, Baba announcement officially transfer to J1 club, Hokkaido Consadole Sapporo for upcoming 2023 season.

Career statistics 

.

Club 

Notes

References

External links

2001 births
Living people
Association football people from Chiba Prefecture
Japanese footballers
Japan youth international footballers
Association football defenders
J1 League players
J2 League players
Hokkaido Consadole Sapporo players
Tokyo Verdy players